The first cabinet of Dimitrie A. Sturdza was the government of Romania from 4 October 1895 to 21 November 1896.

Ministers
The ministers of the cabinet were as follows:

President of the Council of Ministers:
Dimitrie A. Sturdza (4 October 1895 - 21 November 1896)
Minister of the Interior: 
Nicolae Fleva (4 October 1895 - 15 January 1896)
(interim) Dimitrie A. Sturdza (15 January - 3 February 1896)
Anastase Stolojan (3 February - 21 November 1896)
Minister of Foreign Affairs: 
Dimitrie A. Sturdza (4 October 1895 - 21 November 1896)
Minister of Finance:
George C. Cantacuzino-Râfoveanu (4 October 1895 - 21 November 1896)
Minister of Justice:
Eugeniu Stătescu (4 October 1895 - 21 November 1896)
Minister of War:
Gen. Constantin Budișteanu (4 October 1895 - 21 November 1896)
Minister of Religious Affairs and Public Instruction:
Petru Poni (4 October 1895 - 21 November 1896)
Minister of Agriculture, Industry, Commerce, and Property:
Gheorghe Pallade (4 October 1895 - 21 November 1896)
Minister of Public Works:
Constantin I. Stoicescu (4 October 1895 - 21 November 1896)

References

Cabinets of Romania
Cabinets established in 1895
Cabinets disestablished in 1896
1895 establishments in Romania
1896 disestablishments in Romania